Fabio Carvalho may refer to:

Fábio Carvalho (footballer, born 1978), Brazilian football goalkeeper
Fabio Carvalho (footballer, born 1993), Swiss football defender
Fábio Carvalho (footballer, born 2002), Portuguese football winger